The 17th Golden Eagle Awards were held August 18, 1999, in Shenzhen.  
Nominees and winners are listed below, winners are in bold.

Television Series

Best Television Series
My Fair Princess/还珠格格
Yongzheng Dynasty/雍正王朝
Red Prescription/红处方
Sisters/姐妹
Graduatee/毕业生
To Lead by the Hand/牵手
Mother in Law, Daughter in Law, Sister in Law/婆婆·媳妇·小姑
Ah, the mountain/啊，山还是山
Heaven can Mercy/天若有情
Shaoxing Brainman/绍兴师爷

Best Directing for a Television Series
Yang Yang for To Lead by the Hand

Best Writing for a Television Series
Liu Heping, Luo Qianglie for Yongzheng Dynasty

Best Lead Actor in a Television Series
Tang Guoqiang for Yongzheng Dynasty
Wu Ruopu for To Lead by the Hand
Cheng Jianxun for Tiger in the Mountain

Best Lead Actress in a Television Series
Zhao Wei for My Fair Princess
Jiang Wenli for To Lead by the Hand
Chang Yuan for Sisters

Best Supporting Actor in a Television Series
Jiao Huang for Yongzheng Dynasty
Wang Huichun for Yongzheng Dynasty
Yan Zhicheng for To Lead by the Hand

Best Supporting Actress in a Television Series
Yang Kun for Mother in Law, Daughter in Law, Sister in Law
He Lin for To Lead by the Hand
Gai Lili for Silver Chamber

Best Art Direction for a Television Series
Qin Duo for Yongzheng Dynasty

Best Cinematography for a Television Series
Ma Ning for To Lead by the Hand

Best Editing for a Television Series
Liu Miaomiao for Yongzheng Dynasty

Best Lighting for a Television Series
Du Peng for Red Prescription

Documentary Program

Best Television Documentary
not awarded this year
Days of Macau/澳门岁月
Chinese Shield/中华之盾
China Museum/中国博物馆
20 Years Anniversary - The Reform and Open to the Outside World/改革开放二十年
Chinese/中国人
Decisive Battle in Jiujiang/决战九江
Jinchaji Artistic Soldier/晋察冀文艺兵
Records of PRC/共和国之最

Best Short Documentary
not awarded this year
A Hero Never Dies/真心英雄
The Start of Hope/希望从这里延伸
Chinese Surgeon and English War Prisoner/中国军医和英国战浮
A Report for a Silent World/来自无声世界的报告
Natural Color/本色
Three Sisters of Miao nationality/苗家三姐妹
Love Story/生活特别记录——爱的故事
Employing Mother/应聘妈妈

Best Writing and Directing for a Television Documentary
Li Kai, Hu Zheng for Days of Macau

Best Cinematography for a Television Documentary
Duo Ji, Hu Zheng for Days of Macau

Best Sound Recording for a Television Documentary
Wang Qingwu, Suo Guoqing, Feng Qi, Wang Jiankang for Jinchaji Artistic Soldier

Children & Teens Program

Best Animation
not award this year
Little Muddled God/小糊涂神
Legend of Mad Monk/济公传奇
Fool Cat/阿笨猫
Vagabond Life of Bei/小贝流浪记
God Chinese/封神榜传奇
Elf Huidou/小精灵灰豆

Best Directing for an Animation
Directing group for Vagabond Life of Bei

Best Writing for an Animation
Sun Youjun for Vagabond Life of Bei

Best Image Design for an Animation
Ma Shouhong for Little Muddled God

Best Sense Design for an Animation
Yu Zhenyan for God Chinese

Best Composing for an Animation
Liang Gang for Fool Cat

References

External links

1999
1999 in Chinese television
Mass media in Shenzhen